The House of Kleist is the name of an old and distinguished Pomeranian Prussian noble family, whose members obtained many important military positions within the Kingdom of Prussia and later in the German Empire.

Notable members 
Henning Alexander von Kleist (1677–1749).  Prussian field marshal.
Ewald Jürgen von Kleist (c. 1700–1748); co-inventor of the Leyden jar
Ewald Christian von Kleist (1715–1759); German poet and soldier
Barbara Sophia von Kleist, mother of Adam Stanisław Grabowski (1741–1766) Prince-Bishop of Ermland/Bishopric of Warmia
Friedrich Emil Ferdinand Heinrich Graf Kleist von Nollendorf (April 9, 1762 – February 17, 1823), born and died in Berlin, was a Prussian field marshal
Heinrich von Kleist (October 18, 1777 – November 21, 1811), German poet, dramatist, novelist and short story writer. The Kleist Prize, a prestigious prize for German literature, is named after him
Karl Wilhelm Heinrich von Kleist (1836–1917), General of the Cavalry (Germany) 
Paul Ludwig Ewald von Kleist (1881–1954); German field marshal
Ewald von Kleist-Schmenzin (1890–1945); conspirator in the 20 July plot to assassinate Adolf Hitler
Ewald-Heinrich von Kleist-Schmenzin (1922–2013); son of Ewald von Kleist-Schmenzin; another conspirator in the 20 July bomb plot and founder of the Munich Security Conference
Erica von Kleist (1982–); Jazz musician

External links 
Homepage of the family von Kleist
Relation between the von Kleist above

 
German noble families
Prussian nobility